Sode may refer to:

Sode, Haute-Garonne, a commune in the Haute-Garonne department in France
Sode, Togo
The pauldron-analogue in Japanese armor.